Thunderhead is a 2018 young-adult novel by Neal Shusterman and is the second in the Arc of a Scythe series, following Scythe.

Reception 
Thunderhead has received the following accolades:

 Cooperative Children's Book Council Choices
 Bank Street Best Children's Book of the Year Selection Title
 American Library Association/Young Adult Library Services Association Teens' Top Ten List
 Wisconsin State Reading Association's Reading List

References 

2018 American novels
2018 fantasy novels
2018 science fiction novels
2018 children's books
American young adult novels
American science fiction novels
American fantasy novels
Young adult fantasy novels
Children's science fiction novels
Dystopian novels
Novels set in the future
Simon & Schuster books